George Nga Mtafu (1943 in Likoma Island, Nyasaland – October 20, 2015 in Blantyre, Malawi) was a Malawian politician. Mtafu was foreign minister of his country from 1996-1997.

He was Malawi's first ever neurosurgeon. After his political life, he returned to practice until his death.
George Mtafu died on 20 October 2015 at Mwaiwathu Private Hospital a few hours after being involved in a road accident when the car he was driving collided with a truck in the Malawi's commercial city of Blantyre.
He was survived by his wife Elvey Kalonga Mtafu; and his two children Anke Mtafu Pagaja and Bentley Nga Mtafu; as well as two grandchildren, Havana Zaina Pagaja and Thiago Mtafu.

References

1942 births
2015 deaths
Malawian diplomats
Foreign Ministers of Malawi